The Nottinghamshire Cricket Board is the governing body for all recreational cricket in the historic county of Nottinghamshire.

From 1999 to 2003 the Board fielded a team in the English domestic one-day tournament, matches which had List-A status.

Structure
The Board is structured so there are a number of sub committees, created to ensure input to the Board Chairman. These are the Finance, Policy, Development, Publicity, Advisory Services & Promotions, Senior Cricket, Junior, Youth and Coaching, Schools Cricket, Women & Girls Cricket and Cricket for the Disabled.

References

External links
 Nottinghamshire Cricket Board site

County Cricket Boards
Cricket in Nottinghamshire